Brynglas is an area of the city of Newport, South Wales, United Kingdom.

Location 

Brynglas is situated above the M4 motorway in Newport and famous on traffic reports of congestion at the Brynglas Tunnels.

Amenities & history 
Brynglas is well known for its great views overlooking the city of Newport. Brynglas today has a population of about 300 inhabitants and contains a primary school and Brynglas House. The name is from the Welsh language for "Blue Hill". Locals speculate that the reasoning for this name is due to the thousands of Common bluebells that appear each spring in the Brynglas Bluebell woods. Prior to development the south-facing hill would have appeared blue during the spring around April and May and therefore was called 'Brynglas'.

The area consists of the streets of Brynglas Avenue, Brynglas Drive, Brynglas Road, Brynglas Close, Brynglas Court, Brynglas Crescent and the relatively modern Bryn-Bevan estate.

Local landmarks
Brynglas House
Crindau House (Oldest house in Newport)
Brynglas Primary School

Brynglas Tunnels

Brynglas Road was the first road to be built in the Brynglas area. The houses were privately owned. The road originally led solely to Brynglas House on top of the hill. Later on, a council estate, Brynglas Drive was added.

Brynglas Drive consists mostly of quickly built post-war concrete-structured housing and were originally built and owned by Newport Corporation. Most of the housing has now been bought privately but Newport City Council still own some.

Brynglas Court and Brynglas Close consist of council-style flats.

Bryn Bevan, off Brynglas Road, is the latest addition to the Brynglas area. The simple-styled housing was very cost-effective and has great views overlooking the city.

Brynglas Tunnels

The Brynglas Tunnels carry the M4 motorway under Brynglas Hill in Newport. The 1,200 ft-long twin-bored tunnels were the first tunnels in the British motorway network and are still the only bored tunnels using tunnel boring machines.

The tunnels and adjacent Usk bridge were originally planned by Newport Corporation in August 1959 in a plan submitted to the Ministry of Transport. Work started on 10 September 1962 and both structures were complete and open to traffic by 1967.

Almost as soon as the M4 Newport bypass (junctions 24-28) had opened, the traffic levels had grown to such a degree that the road had to be widened to three lanes in each direction. This was finished in 1982 but with the exception of the tunnels and Usk bridge which remained as dual two-lane sections. During the original construction several houses on Brynglas Road above the tunnels had to be demolished due to structural weaknesses caused by the tunnelling. Therefore the technical challenges and risk associated with widening the existing tunnels in a highly built-up area were found to be too great. The tunnels remain a bottleneck on the motorway and as of 2011 a new bypass south of the city has been proposed, the M4 relief road.

Brynglas House
Currently is the Training department for Newport Social Services owned by Newport City Council, however it has had many uses in the past such as being used as a hospital during World War II and a secondary school through the 1960s and early 1970s And an Adult Education Centre until 2014. The gardens and pleasure grounds surrounding the house are listed on the Cadw/ICOMOS Register of Parks and Gardens of Special Historic Interest in Wales.

Government 
The area is governed by the Newport City Council.

References

External links
 Brynglas House
 Brynglas Tunnels
 Newport City Council
 Photos of Brynglas and surrounding area on geograph.org.uk

Districts of Newport, Wales
Registered historic parks and gardens in Newport